, also spelled  or Ik Oankaar (Gurmukhi:  or); literally, "There is only one God or One creator  or one Om-maker") is a phrase in Sikhism that denotes the one supreme reality. It is a central tenet of Sikh religious philosophy.

 are the first words of the Mul Mantar and also the opening words of the Sikh holy scripture Guru Granth Sahib.  The first symbol "ik" is actually not a word but the Punjabi symbol for the number 1.

 is interpreted as "one and only one, who cannot be compared or contrasted with any other", the "unmanifest, Lord in power, the holy word, the primal manifestation of the Godhead by which and in which all live, move and have their being and by which all find a way back to Absolute God, the Supreme Reality."

 has a distinct spelling in the Gurmukhi script and the phrase is found in many Sikh religious scriptures and inscribed in places of worship such as gurdwaras.

In Mul Mantar 

 is also the opening phrase of the Mul Mantar, present as opening phrase in the Guru Granth Sahib, and the first composition of Guru Nanak and the final salok is by Guru Angad. Further, the Mul Mantar is also at the beginning of the Japji Sahib, followed by 38 hymns and a final Salok by Guru Angad at the end of this composition.

Description 

 is the statement of oneness in Sikhism, that is 'there is one God'.

Etymologically, the word  denotes the sacred sound "om" or the absolute in a number of Indian religions. Nevertheless, Sikhs give it an entirely different meaning. Pashaura Singh writes that "the meaning of Oankar in the Sikh tradition is quite different in certain respects from the various interpretations of this word in the Indian philosophical traditions", and the Sikhs "rather view Oankar as pointing to the distinctively Sikh theological emphasis on the ineffable quality of God, who is described as 'the Person beyond time,' the Eternal One, or 'the One without form'."  is, according to Wazir Singh, a "variation of Om (Aum) of the ancient Indian scriptures (with a slight change in its orthography), implying the seed-force that evolves as the universe." Guru Nanak wrote a poem entitled Oankar in which, states Doniger, he "attributed the origin and sense of speech to the Divinity, who is thus the Om-maker".

Pashaura Singh goes on to state,
 

Other common terms for the one supreme reality alongside , dating from the Gurus' time include the most commonly used term, Akal Purakh, "Eternal One," in the sense of Nirankar, "the One without form," and Waheguru ("Wonderful Sovereign").

Depictions
In 2019, Air India launched a direct flight from London to Amritsar  with the phrase  printed in golden colour with a red background, on the tail of a Boeing 787 Dreamliner. The plane was launched ahead of and in honour of the 550th anniversary of Guru Nanak’s birth.

See also
Tawhid
Waheguru
Om

References

External links

Discussion On Ek Onkar Translation
Fast facts on sikhism and Ik Onkar
Religious Studies Ik Onkar

Shabda
Sikh symbols
Singular God
Names of God in Sikhism
Sikh terminology